Jahanabad-e Bala (also Romanized as Jahānābād-e Bālā; also known as Jahānābād and Jehānābād) is a village in Fahraj Rural District, in the Central District of Fahraj County, Kerman Province, Iran. At the 2006 census, its population was 866, in 181 families.

References 

Populated places in Fahraj County